Rahmanullah Gurbaz (born 28 November 2001) is an Afghan cricketer. He made his international debut for Afghanistan in September 2019. His father and mother are of Gurbaz tribe from Afghanistan. In January 2021, he became the first batsman for Afghanistan to score a century on debut in a One Day International (ODI) match.

Domestic and T20 career
Gurbaz made his List A debut for Afghanistan A against Zimbabwe A during their tour to Zimbabwe on 27 January 2017. He made his Twenty20 debut for Mis Ainak Knights in the 2017 Shpageeza Cricket League on 12 September 2017. He made his first-class debut for Mis Ainak Region in the 2018 Ahmad Shah Abdali 4-day Tournament on 1 March 2018.

In September 2018, Gurbaz was named in Paktia's squad in the first edition of the Afghanistan Premier League tournament. In November 2019, he was selected to play for the Khulna Tigers in the 2019–20 Bangladesh Premier League. In July 2020, he was named in the Barbados Tridents squad for the 2020 Caribbean Premier League.

In April 2021, Gurbaz was signed by Multan Sultans to play in the rescheduled matches in the 2021 Pakistan Super League. In November 2021, he was selected to play for the Jaffna Kings following the players' draft for the 2021 Lanka Premier League. In December 2021, he was signed by Islamabad United following the players' draft for the 2022 Pakistan Super League.

In March 2022, Gurbaz was named as Jason Roy's replacement in the Gujarat Titans squad for the 2022 Indian Premier League. In July 2022, he was signed by the Jaffna Kings for the third edition of the Lanka Premier League. He was traded to Kolkata Knight Riders ahead of the IPL 2023 and will represent the two time IPL Champions.

International career
In December 2017, Gurbaz was named in Afghanistan's squad for the 2018 Under-19 Cricket World Cup.

In October 2019, Gurbaz was the leading run-scorer for Afghanistan in the 2018 ACC Under-19 Asia Cup, with 117 runs in four matches. In December 2018, he was named in Afghanistan's under-23 team for the 2018 ACC Emerging Teams Asia Cup.

In August 2019, Gurbaz was named in Afghanistan's Twenty20 International (T20I) squad for the 2019–20 Bangladesh Tri-Nation Series. He made his T20I debut for Afghanistan, against Zimbabwe, on 14 September 2019.

In January 2021, Gurbaz was named in Afghanistan's One Day International (ODI) squad for their series against Ireland. He made his ODI debut for Afghanistan, against Ireland, on 21 January 2021, scoring 127 runs, becoming the first Afghan player to score a century on ODI debut and 16th overall.

In September 2021, he was named in Afghanistan's squad for the 2021 ICC Men's T20 World Cup.

References

External links
 

2001 births
Living people
Afghan cricketers
Afghanistan One Day International cricketers
Afghanistan Twenty20 International cricketers
Boost Defenders cricketers
Mis Ainak Knights cricketers
Paktia Panthers cricketers
Islamabad United cricketers
Multan Sultans cricketers
Place of birth missing (living people)
Kandy Falcons cricketers
Jaffna Kings cricketers
Cricketers who made a century on One Day International debut